This is a list of weapons and equipment currently used by the Lithuanian Armed Forces. For the naval equipment and ships, see Lithuanian Naval Force; for the list of aircraft, see Lithuanian Air Force.

Lithuania uses military equipment compatible with the NATO standards.

Infantry weapons

Armoured combat vehicles

Artillery

Air-defence equipment

Radars

Logistic and engineering vehicles

Light utility vehicles

Rocket systems

Unmanned aerial vehicles

Unmanned ground vehicles

See also

References

External links
Ministry of the National defence of the Republic of Lithuania

Equipment
Lithuania
Equipment